Ferntree Gully is a suburb in Melbourne, Victoria, Australia, at the foothills of the Dandenong Ranges, 30 km south-east of Melbourne's Central Business District, located within the City of Knox local government area. Ferntree Gully recorded a population of 27,398 at the 2021 census.

The suburb is on the Belgrave railway line and it takes between 42 minutes (stopping all stations and then express service from Box Hill) to 60 minutes (all stations service) to Flinders Street, CBD.

The William Angliss Public Hospital and Emergency Centre is located in Upper Ferntree Gully, approximately 2 kilometres south of Ferntree Gully.

Ferntree Gully, The Basin, Boronia and Upper Ferntree Gully are the only Dandenong Ranges towns or suburbs in the City of Knox (although some parts of Upper Ferntree Gully are within the Shire of Yarra Ranges). The City of Knox is one of the few cities not broken-up during the Kennett government review of councils and had its area expanded to include parts of Upper Ferntree Gully that were previously in the Shire of Sherbrooke (now part of the Yarra Ranges Shire).

Ferntree Gully and Belgrave are sister suburbs  and are very closely linked in many ways. Ferntree Gully is younger than Belgrave (Belgrave being established in 1851 and Ferntree Gully in 1880).

Ferntree Gully has many Eucalyptus trees (gum trees) and lies at the foothills of the Dandenong Ranges. Its boundaries meet Upper Ferntree Gully, a separate but similarly named suburb with the same postcode, Boronia to the North, Scoresby to the West and Lysterfield to the South. The eastern boundary coincides with the Ferntree Gully National Park which is a National Park administered by the Federal Government. Ferntree Gully is in a high fire risk area in the vicinity of the Ferntree Gully National Park, however the majority of the suburb is considered low risk.

Environment

Natural features include a large part of the Dandenong Ranges National Park which forms a picturesque backdrop to Ferntree Gully, especially the Ferntree Gully village part of the suburb. Important features of that national park include One Tree Hill (formerly a fire-lookout, but now covered with trees, the lookout has been removed), and the Kokoda Trail, a memorial walk dedicated to the Kokoda Trail of WW2 (includes interpretive signage)—this part of the National Park (which is well known as "1000 steps", where many tourists go) is located in the neighbouring suburb of Upper Ferntree Gully—and accessed via the Mt Dandenong Tourist Road. It is also a place for picnics and exercise, where many community groups meet.

History

Ferntree Gully, was home to the Wurundjeri Aboriginal tribe prior to European settlement. The abundance of Tree Ferns stretched from the Township to the National Park and picturesque scenery and lush flora started attracting recreational visitors from the 1870s. In 1882 the gully was set aside for public use. Throughout the 1880s the township began to grow, shops were established, as well as hotels, churches, and a primary school. With the arrival of the railway line (extended from Ringwood) in 1889, the area became more accessible to visitors. Initially the line terminated at Upper Ferntree Gully, with a narrow-gauge line extending to Gembrook in 1900. Between 1958 and 1962 the narrow-gauge 2' 6" line was upgraded to broad-gauge 5' 3" and electrified to Belgrave which is where the narrow-gauge line (now better known as Puffing Billy) operates from today. Up until the mid-1970s the old Puffing Billy Railway shed was located below Quarry Road just west of Upper Ferntree Gully railway station. The Shire of Fern Tree Gully also was proclaimed in 1889. One of the Buildings from the old shire offices, on the corner of Selman Avenue and Burwood Highway, Ferntree Gully, has been preserved under a heritage listing and now houses a community health service (entry via Selman Avenue). It was also used as the local library for many years. On 4 July 1969 the Shire of Knox was proclaimed a "City" and new offices were built on Burwood Highway Wantirna South where the offices are today. The Ferntree Gully cemetery is the resting place of a number of historically significant local people as well as world-renowned artists, authors and poets.

Ambleside Homestead, in Olivebank Road, Ferntree Gully, was built in the 1890s and is now the base for the Knox Historical Society and a local history museum. It holds extensive collections of historic documents and photographs dating back to the 1800s and is also the custodian of all old school photographs from the City and Shires of Knox schools maintaining an accurate collection up to today. Old school photos from FTG and Boronia High, Knox Tech and primary schools are on display and available for copy for a fee. Period furnishings and artefacts and vintage farm equipment reflect the pioneer life and development of the area.

W. Kennedy-Ross, a Scot, secured the title to the triangular section bounded by Ferntree Gully Road, Scoresby Road and Burwood Highway, in 1872. About 1886, Ross erected the Hunting Tower Hotel, which was replaced a few years later by the Club Hotel. The owner of this hotel, one W. Town, gave the name Kent Park to the area west of Dobson Street.

A John Aitken bought Kent Park in 1913, selling most of the original purchase to a Mr Powell in 1921. The latter then sold to a Brigadier Knox, who in turn sold all except  to Alex Creswick. The Education Department bought the land on which Kent Park primary school now stands; the school opened in February 1975.

Ferntree Gully Post Office opened on 1 January 1873. It was renamed Ferntree Gully South when the Lower Ferntree Gully Office opened (open since 1948) and was renamed Ferntree Gully. This office closed in 1997 through privatisation but opened next door soon after. The present Mountain Gate office opened in 1972 but was known as Ferntree Gully West for some months. Upper Ferntree Gully office opened in 1890.

Community

There is the Ferntree Gully library and community centre, where the Knox Festival is held in March every year (the alternative venue being in Rowville). Each December, the Knox Christmas Carols are held on the grounds of the Ferntree Gully football/Cricket club in Brenock Park Drive (now known as Wally Tew Reserve).

Notable community and retail sites in Ferntree Gully include the Coolstore on Dorset Road (which was owned and run by local orchardist Ken Dobson and his family for over 40 years until 2007), Woolworths Supermarket, Brennock Park Drive is one of the busiest in Australia, the Knox Environment Society (based at the rear of Ferntree Gully Secondary College, which closed at the end of 2006) and the Knox Historical Society (based at Ambleside Historical homestead). There are two pubs in Ferntree Gully, both on Burwood Highway—The Ferntree Gully Hotel (or "The Middle") and the Club Hotel (the former Vass's Pub).

Retirement villages include Amaroo on Burwood Highway and Glengollan on Underwood Road.

Places of worship

There are a number of groups providing for the local community. These include the Ferntree Gully Seventh Day Adventist Church in Upper Ferntree Gully, Hills Christian Life Church, Ferntree Gully Baptist Church, Ferntree Gully Independent Baptist Church, Armenian Catholic Church, Saint John the Baptist Catholic Church, Foothills Community Church, Olive Branch Fellowship, Salvation Army, Ferntree Gully Uniting Church and the Upper Gully Christadelphians
The former Churches of England, Methodist and Presbyterian were located in the Ferntree Gully Village in Station Street (C of E), at the intersection of Selman Avenue, The Avenue (M) and Francis Crescent (P). The Church of England moved to a new site on Burwood Highway near Burke Rd and recently merged with the Rowville church with the land being sold for housing.

Sport

There are a number of sports represented in Ferntree Gully including cricket, netball (the Mountain Districts Netball Association courts are based in Ferntree Gully), basketball (Knox City Basketball Centre & Club ), Australian rules football (Ferntree Gully Eagles and Eastern Lions compete in the Eastern Football League), tennis, swimming (Knox-Sherbrooke Swimming Centre), table tennis, lawn bowls and gymnastics (Knox Gymnastics Centre). A baseball complex is located in nearby Upper Ferntree Gully (Kings Park, Willow Road, Upper Ferntree Gully).

Ambulance Victoria

Ferntree Gully has one Ambulance Victoria station it holds up to three Ambulances. In 2016 Works started on upgrades at the time all Ambulance Victoria staff and Ambulances where moved to the CFA station. In 2017 the new station opened.

CFA

Ferntree Gully is home to a fully volunteer CFA Fire Brigade established in 1942. Boasting two engine bays and four appliances and a services building at the rear it is one of the busiest volunteer stations in the state. It is backed up by other volunteer CFA Brigades in The Basin, Scoresby and Upper Ferntree Gully and including two permanent/volunteer stations in Boronia and Rowville.

Schools

In the immediate vicinity of Ferntree Gully Railway station is an abundance of schools. St John's Primary School and St Josephs Secondary College and Ferntree Gully North Primary School are all within 10 minutes walk. Mater Christi College for girls in Belgrave is a 12-minute train ride. There are also primary schools at Mountain Gate and Wattleview Primary school and Kent Park Primary School. It also has pre schools in the area.

Education

There are several Primary schools — Wattleview Primary School, Eastern Ranges School, Ferntree Gully North Primary School, Kent Park Primary School, Mountain Gate Primary School, St John the Baptist Primary School, and Fairhills Primary School. The site of the former Ferntree Gully Primary school (Burwood Highway, Ferntree Gully) houses a number of buildings of historical significance for the area. The school itself closed at the end of the 2005 school year and has been developed as social housing.

There is one secondary school in Ferntree Gully—St Joseph's College (A Catholic boys college in the care of the Salesians of Don Bosco for students in Years 7 – 12). There was another secondary school—Ferntree Gully Secondary College (for students in Years 7–12)—which closed at the end of the 2006 school year. The U3A (University of the Third Age) for retired persons is a co-operative education setting located in Ferntree Gully.

There are a number of kindergartens in Ferntree Gully including Bena Angliss Pre-school.

Community groups

Community groups include Ferntree Gully CFA volunteer fire brigade, Scouts at 1st Ferntree Gully and 4th Knox, Girl Guides and Rotary.

Transport

Ferntree Gully has a railway station located on Station Street, near the shopping district, which was previously known as Lower Ferntree Gully, followed by Fern Tree Gully, having been changed to the latter on 29 February 1972. A number of Melbourne bus routes also service the suburb which is run by Ventura bus lines and use the Ferntree Gully Railway station located on Station Street as a Terminus. The Railway station is a Premium fully staffed Metro station with PSOs after 6pm. There are 1000 car parking spaces. 108 trains pass through Ferntree Gully per day between Belgrave and the CBD with many running express from Box Hill to the city and express to Box hill on the way to Belgrave.

Notable people

Cricketer Shane Warne was born in Upper Ferntree Gully on 13 September 1969 at the Angliss Hospital (Talaskia Road, Upper Ferntree Gully), as was Brisbane Lions triple premiership player Shaun Hart.

Collingwood Footballer Jaidyn Stephenson grew up in Ferntree Gully and attended the St Josephs Secondary College prior to joining the Collingwood Football Club.

Noel John McNamara (born 12 January 1938) is an Australian campaigner for victims of crime and outspoken critic of the Australian justice system. In 1993 Noel established the Crime Victims Support Association (CVSA) with his wife Bev McNamara. The association is politically involved and lobbies the government on criminal law reform and greater support for victims of crime.

Professional Major League Baseball players Bradley Harman, Justin Huber and Michael Nakamura played baseball at Upwey Ferntree Gully Baseball Club, which is located at Kings Park.

Actress Pippa Black, who portrayed Elle Robinson in the TV series Neighbours, was born in Ferntree Gully on 16 October 1982.

Shopping centre

Mountain Gate Shopping Centre lies on the corner of Ferntree Gully Road and Burwood Highway. Its retail outlets include Woolworths, Coles, bookstore, news agency, butchers, bakeries and a variety of other stores. There is also an Officeworks, Aldi and a Pet Barn. The Ferntree Gully Village at the intersection of Station Street, Alpine Street and Forest Road is the official site of Ferntree Gully Township, Railway Station and historic town centre. It contains an IGA and one other supermarket, green grocer's, butchers and curiosity shops as well as a selection of unique restaurants and cafes. It also has one of the busiest railway stations in the City of Knox.

See also
 Electoral district of Ferntree Gully

References

Suburbs of Melbourne
Suburbs of the City of Knox